Hassan Nemazee (born January 27, 1950) is a multimillionaire Iranian-American investment banker and convicted felon.

Life
Nemazee was born in Washington, D.C., on January 27, 1950, and attended Landon School, graduating in 1968. He received his Bachelor of Arts (BA) degree with Honors from Harvard University in 1972.

Nemazee has not returned to Iran since the Iranian revolution. Most of his family's property was seized by the new Iranian government.  On August 25, 2009, Nemazee was arrested for fraudulently applying for a loan of over $74 million from Citigroup. The maximum penalty for the offense is 30 years in prison. He was subsequently accused of fraudulently obtaining $292 million of loans from three banks and of using the proceeds to both support his lifestyle and make political contributions

Nemazee is the brother of Susie Nemazee, the wife of the British Ambassador to the United States from 2012-2016, Sir Peter Westmacott.

Nemazee is the Chairman of Nemazee Capital. Based upon the allegations of fraud contained in Mr. Nemazee's indictment, it is difficult to determine what legitimate business, if any, was ever conducted by Nemazee Capital.

Business interests
Nemazee Capital was established in 1987 and was purported, on its website, to have, either directly or through associated entities, invested in the following sectors: health care, media, oil and gas, insurance, investment banking, asset management, newspapers, real estate development, technology, and communications.

Nemazee claims to have created Nemazee Holdings in the early 1970s and entered the financial services industry by partnering directly with AIG; at the time, according to information supplied by Nemazee, it was unique for the insurance giant to enter into such a relationship. Around this same time Nemazee claims to have created a joint venture for the establishment of a bank with Morgan Guaranty Trust Company, predecessor to JP Morgan & Co. Nemazee Capital evolved out of Nemazee Holdings and originally focused on real estate development.

Political involvement
Nemazee was, prior to his arrest, also known as one of the top political bundlers in the United States.

President Clinton nominated Nemazee to be Ambassador to Argentina on January 6, 1999, but the nomination was returned without action on August 5, 1999.

During the 2004 United States presidential election, Nemazee was a supporter of John Kerry and a major contributor to his campaign. 
He was the New York Finance Chair for the Kerry campaign, and later the national finance chairman of the Democratic Senatorial Campaign Committee. 
With Nemazee as the national finance chair, Chuck Schumer's DSCC in 2006 raised $115 million, outpacing the NRSC by substantial sums, and helping the Democratic Party take control of the Senate. During his presidency, Bill Clinton nominated Nemazee to fill the position of U.S. Ambassador to Argentina. Due to Congressional concerns about Nemazee's convoluted and controversial business dealings, the nomination was subsequently withdrawn
More recently, Nemazee served as Finance Chairman to Hillary Clinton's 2007-08 presidential campaign, and also donated $50,000 (the maximum amount) to Barack Obama's Presidential Inaugural Committee. In addition, Nemazee was a bundler for the 2009 Presidential Inaugural Committee.

Arrest
Hassan Nemazee was arrested on August 25, 2009, for allegedly defrauding Citi bank by using false documents to secure a loan.

Nemazee's additional frauds exceed $100 million, according to federal prosecutors 

In July 2010 he was convicted of multiple counts of bank fraud and wire fraud and was sentenced to  years in prison by U.S. District Court Judge Sidney H. Stein in the United States District Court for the Southern District of New York in Manhattan.

Hassan Nemazee was released from prison in February 2019 under the First Step Act.

References

External links
"Rehabilitation in Iran" from the New York Times
"Iranian Hospital Center Said To Rival Best In U.S." from the New York Times
"U.S.-Type Hospital Dedicated By Shah" from the New York Times
"A nod for envoy to Argentina" from Iranian.com
"Blue in Your Face: Can the Democrats stay united long enough to take back the Senate? At least it's easier for them to raise money now" from New York Online Magazine
"Obama shares fundraisers with Clinton" from USA Today
"Clinton, Obama Could Help Each Other Financially" from USA Today
"Clinton Asks Top Donors to Meeting With Obama" from the AP
"Hassan Nemazee, Nemazee Capital Corporation’s Chairman and CEO Arrested this Morning" from www.BackgroundNow.com
.  FT Comment. Our ambassador to Paris, Sir Peter Westmacott, soon to be Ambassador in Washington, is married to Susie Nemazee, an Iranian-American. Lady Westmacott is the sister of Hassan Nemazee.

New York (state) Democrats
American people of Iranian descent
American businesspeople
Iranian businesspeople
American white-collar criminals
American political fundraisers
Harvard University alumni
1950 births
Living people
American people convicted of fraud
American businesspeople convicted of crimes
20th-century American diplomats